Orono is city in Hennepin County, Minnesota, United States west of Minneapolis. Located on the north shore of Lake Minnetonka, Orono is one of the city’s most upscale and wealthiest neighborhoods and also known for its sparse suburban character and abundant wildlife. 

The population was 7,437 at the 2010 census. Orono is in the Minneapolis-Saint Paul metropolitan area.

History
Orono was originally part of Excelsior Township. In 1868, it became part of Medina Township. Residents received permission from Hennepin County to form the independent town of Orono in 1889. It was incorporated as a city in 1955.

Orono is named after Orono, Maine, the hometown of early resident George A. Brackett.

Geography
U.S. Highway 12 serves as a main route.

Demographics

2010 census
As of the census of 2010, there were 7,437 people, 2,826 households, and 2,155 families living in the city. The racial makeup of the city was 96.5% White, 0.4% African American, 0.2% Native American, 1.1% Asian, 0.6% from other races, and 1.1% from two or more races. Hispanic or Latino of any race were 1.7% of the population.

There were 2,826 households, of which 35.2% had children under the age of 18 living with them, 67.7% were married couples living together, 5.5% had a female householder with no husband present, 3.1% had a male householder with no wife present, and 23.7% were non-families. 18.5% of all households were made up of individuals, and 6.7% had someone living alone who was 65 years of age or older. The average household size was 2.63 and the average family size was 3.02.  As of the 2013 American Community Survey, the Orono median household and family incomes are $100,362 and $117,024, respectively.  Less than 2.5% of all families are living at or below the poverty level.

The median age in the city was 45.7 years. 26.6% of residents were under the age of 18; 4.3% were between the ages of 18 and 24; 17.7% were from 25 to 44; 38.8% were from 45 to 64; and 12.6% were 65 years of age or older. The gender makeup of the city was 51.2% male and 48.8% female.

2000 census
As of the census of 2000, there were 7,538 people, 2,766 households, and 2,196 families living in the city. The racial makeup of the city was 97.73% White, 0.27% African American, 0.15% Native American, 0.94% Asian, 0.24% from other races, and 0.68% from two or more races. Hispanic or Latino of any race were 0.86% of the population.

There were 2,766 households, out of which 38.0% had children under the age of 18 living with them, 71.8% were married couples living together, 5.2% had a female householder with no husband present, and 20.6% were non-families. 15.8% of all households were made up of individuals, and 4.2% had someone living alone who was 65 years of age or older.  The average household size was 2.72 and the average family size was 3.06.

In the city, the population was spread out, with 27.4% under the age of 18, 4.5% from 18 to 24, 26.7% from 25 to 44, 32.5% from 45 to 64, and 9.0% who were 65 years of age or older.  The median age was 41 years. For every 100 females, there were 103.5 males.  For every 100 females age 18 and over, there were 102.0 males.

The median income for a household in the city was $88,314, and the median income for a family was $101,114. Males had a median income of $61,913 versus $34,964 for females. The per capita income for the city was $65,825.  About 0.5% of families and 1.2% of the population were below the poverty line, including 1.0% of those under age 18 and 1.6% of those age 65 or over.

Politics

Notable people
George A. Brackett - Early Minnesota businessman and politician
Kevin Garnett - National Basketball Association player
Bruce Dayton - Retail executive and philanthropist, former chairman and CEO of the Dayton Hudson Corporation (now the Target Corporation), founder of B. Dalton bookstores
Irwin L. Jacobs - Corporate raider and entrepreneur
Whitney MacMillan - Billionaire and former Chairman of the Board and CEO of Cargill
William W. McGuire - Former Chairman and CEO of UnitedHealth Group and current owner of the Minnesota United FC soccer team
Gregg Steinhafel - The former President, CEO, and Chairman of the Board of Target Corporation
James J. Hill - The Empire Builder who had a farm on Crystal Bay to supply his Hotel Lafayette.  Gave Hill School to the community.
George S. Pillsbury - was an American businessman and politician.
William Hood Dunwoody - Had a summer home on Brackett's Point.
Mark Dayton - Former Senator, Governor, and former resident. Married Aida Rockefeller (1978-1986).
Greg LeMond - Racing Cyclist and former resident.
Charles Pillsbury - Former resident and namesake for the "Doonesbury" character.
Robert L. Searles - businessman, Minnesota state representative, and mayor of Orono.

See also
 Crystal Bay, Minnesota

References

External links
 
 City website
 ePodunk: Profile for Orono, Minnesota

Cities in Hennepin County, Minnesota
Cities in Minnesota
Populated places established in 1889